Stina Johannes (born January 23, 2000) is a German football player. From July 2018 to March 2022, she was a goalkeeper at SGS Essen. Before moving to Eintracht Frankfurt, she played for three months with the Japanese first division club INAC Kobe Leonessa. In 2022, she was called up to the Germany national team.

Career

Clubs 
Johannes grew up in Burgdorf in the Hanover Region of Lower Saxony.  At the age of seven she moved to Heesseler SV and played for eight years in the corresponding boys' teams.  In 2015 she went to Hannoverscher SC. After one season, the male B-Juniors of the HSC had to do without their goalkeeper, because she switched from the Landesliga to FF USV Jena in the Bundesliga in 2016. There she played for the U17 team in the B-Juniorinnen-Bundesliga, but was already training in the women's team. She made her senior debut on September 3, 2017 (1st matchday) in a 4-1 defeat away to 1. FFC Turbine Potsdam with a 39th-minute substitution for Justien Odeurs, who was injured.  

Since her last league game on June 6, 2021, she has repeatedly struggled with injuries. In order to practice before she switched to Eintracht Frankfurt for the 2022/23 season and succeeded the departing Merle Frohms, she played for the Japanese first division club INAC Kobe Leonessa for three months.

National Team 
In 2014, Johannes was invited to the Hennef sports school for a DFB course. On October 28 of the same year, she made her international debut for the U15 national team.  The game in Glasgow against the hosts of the Scottish U15s was won 13-0 (9-0); so she became Heeßel's first national player. In her second appearance in the national jersey against Belgium on December 3, 2014, she also conceded zero goals.  

Johannes became European champion in 2017 with the U17 national team in the Czech Republic. The semi-final, her fifth international match for the U17s, was decided on penalties in which she saved four shots.

Achievements 

 National team

 Finalist U19 European Championship 2018
 U17 European Champion 2017

 INAC Kobe Leonessa

 Japanese Champion 2022

Web Links 

 Stina Johannes/ in the weltfussball.de database
 Stina Johannes in the soccerdonna.de database
 Stina Johannes in the FuPa.net database
 Stina Johannes in the database of the German Football Association

References 

German women's footballers
FF USV Jena players
SGS Essen players
Eintracht Frankfurt (women) players
2000 births

Germany women's youth international footballers
Association football goalkeepers
Women's association football goalkeepers
Germany women's international footballers
Living people
Hannoverscher SC players
INAC Kobe Leonessa players